Mr. Norman (referree to as P. Norman and N. Norman) was an African-American man who was lynched in Texarkana, Miller County, Arkansas by masked men on February 11, 1922. According to the 1926 report of the United States Senate Committee on the Judiciary, this was  the 12th of 61 lynchings during 1922 in the United States.

Background

Texarkana is a city that straddles the state border of Texas and Arkansas. The west of the city is in Bowie County, Texas and the east is in Miller County, Arkansas. It was developed at a 19th-century junction of two major railroads.

In February 1922, Deputy Sheriff J.R. Jordan of Texarkana was allegedly held at gunpoint by Norman and forced to drive several miles. At some point later, Norman was arrested and held at Ashdown, Arkansas.

Lynching 

Deputy Sheriff J.R. Jordan had driven to Ashdown, Arkansas to pick up Mr. Norman from their jail. On February 11, 1922, while returning to Texarkana, his car was stopped by masked men, near Spring Lake Park. They seized Norman from the car and took him away. The next day Norman's body was found with four gunshot wounds, left on a country road. 

In addition to the lynching, a newspaper reported that  "five white men were flogged, one white man seized and warned, and one negro notified in a note signed KKK to leave the city as a big clean-up was in progress.”

Aftermath

After the lynching, Deputy Sheriff J.R. Jordan was indicted for murder of Norman by the Bowie County grand jury. He was released on a $3,000 ($46,500 in 2022) bond. 

On February 21, 1922, at 10:00 PM in the Four States Pressroom, four masked men burst in armed with guns. They handed a note to the men working there, Charles Nutter, Robert Lusk and the news editor. It read, "we are the four men who took the negro away from Mr. Jordan. We are citizens of Texarkana and intend to stay here. Find us. We are not K.K.K."

National memorial 

The National Memorial for Peace and Justice opened in Montgomery, Alabama, on April 26, 2018. It is devoted to the history of lynchings in the United States and memorializing the victims. The Memorial Corridor features 805 hanging steel rectangles, each representing a county where a documented lynching has taken place. Each rectangle is incised with the names of lynching victims in that county. The memorial hopes that communities, like Miller County, Arkansas where Mr. Norman was lynched, will take these slabs and install them in their own communities.

See also
Lynching of Hullen Owens - Texarkana, Texas

References 
Notes

Bibliography 

 

1922 riots
1922 in Arkansas
African-American history of Arkansas
Lynching deaths in Arkansas 
February 1922 events
Racially motivated violence against African Americans 
Riots and civil disorder in Arkansas 
White American riots in the United States
Texarkana, Arkansas